Platania is a comune and town in the province of Catanzaro in the western part of the Calabria region of Italy.

Bounding communes
 Conflenti 
 Decollatura
 Lamezia Terme
 Serrastretta

Population history

The population grew until the 1950s except for between the censuses of 1901 and 1911, the commune was to be rocked by emigration as the population fell over half since the 1950s census.  Emigration was very large between the 1950s and the 1970s.

References

Cities and towns in Calabria